Psychogena is a genus of moths in the family Cossidae.

Species
Psychogena duplex (Schaus, 1905)
Psychogena miranda Schaus, 1911

References

Natural History Museum Lepidoptera generic names catalog

Hypoptinae
Cossidae genera